Chin Hsiao-hui (born 17 April 1951) is a Taiwanese politician. He currently serves as the Deputy Minister of the Veterans Affairs Council of the Executive Yuan.

References

1951 births
Living people
Taiwanese Ministers of the Veterans Affairs Council